The Mongolian People's Revolutionary Party was a political party in Mongolia which was founded in 2010 by Nambaryn Enkhbayar. The party received approval to use the Mongolian People's Party's old name by the Supreme Court of Mongolia. Enkhbayar, former chairman of the original MPRP and a former President of Mongolia, was the party's leader. It merged back into the Mongolian People's Party in 2021.

Ideology 
The party's stated mission was to:
 Dismantle the oligopoly
 Give more authority to the people
 Give the people Mongolia's natural wealth
 Provide employment and property for every household
 
The MPRP believed that with the implementation of these integrated policies—aimed at creating human-centered social welfare, economic development and citizen-oriented governance—Mongolia and its people would achieve prosperity and progress.

The MPRP, along with the Democratic Party, advocated for restrictions on the number of years a foreign firm can operate in Mongolia, and called for new industrial projects to be fully Mongolian-controlled. This position earned the party the label "populist" by some observers.

Membership 
The MPRP claimed to have 80,000 members in 2012.

History

Justice Coalition 
In May 2012, the MPRP formed the Justice Coalition with the Mongolian National Democratic Party to run for upcoming elections. The Coalition won 11 seats in State Great Khural and became a part of a coalition government with the Democratic Party.

Our Coalition 
In March 2020, the MPRP and Civil Will–Green Party, Mongolian Traditional United Party formed the Our Coalition to run 2020 parliament election.

Merger with the Mongolian People's Party 
On 29 April 2021, the MPRP and the Mongolian People's Party signed an agreement to merge the two parties. The MPRP was deregistered by the Supreme Court on 28 May 2021.

References

External links
  
 Britannica

2010 establishments in Mongolia
2021 disestablishments in Mongolia
Political parties established in 2010
Political parties disestablished in 2021
Political parties in Mongolia
Progressive Alliance
Social democratic parties in Asia
Socialism in Mongolia